The Chief Bearhart  Stakes is a Thoroughbred horse race run annually in late October at Woodbine Racetrack in Toronto, Ontario, Canada. Open to horses age three and older, it is contested on turf over a distance of a mile and a quarter (10 furlongs).

Inaugurated on September 29, 2002, the race is named for Sam-Son Farm's Canadian Hall of Fame colt, Chief Bearhart.

The 2006 race was transferred to the dirt track.

Records
Speed  record: 
 2:04.65 - Simmard (2009)

Most wins:
 No horse has won this race more than once.

Most wins by an owner:
 2 - Gary A. Tanaka (2006, 2007)

Most wins by a jockey:
 No jockey has won this race more than once.

Most wins by a trainer:
 3 - Roger Attfield (2006, 2007, 2009

Winners

References
 Chief Bearhart Stakes history at Woodbine Entertainment

Ungraded stakes races in Canada
Open middle distance horse races
Turf races in Canada
Recurring sporting events established in 2002
Woodbine Racetrack